David Batt may refer to:

David Batt (politician), Australian politician
David Sylvian (born David Alan Batt, 1958), English musician